La Voulte-sur-Rhône (literally La Voulte on Rhône) is a commune in the Ardèche department in southern France.

Population

Lagerstätte

La Voulte-sur-Rhône is a marine Lagerstätte (sedimentary deposit) located in France. It is Middle Jurassic (Callovian) in age, and is known for the variety of fossils it produces, including cephalopods, such as Proteroctopus ribeti, Rhomboteuthis lehmani, and Vampyronassa rhodanica. Fossilized cephalopods are rare, and Voulte-sur-Rhône is prized among paleontologists as one of only a few known localities known to produce such cephalopod fossils. Fossil preservation is by pyrite, a geologically rare process. Other sites with pyrite preserved fossils are Beecher's Trilobite Bed and the Hunsrück Slate.
Also found at the site are ophiuroids, crustaceans, fish, and other pyritized specimens. The exceptional preservation of the fossils at this site is most likely due to the result of oxygen deficient water at the time of the deposition of the fossils, and possibly repeated sediment blanketing.

See also
Communes of the Ardèche department

References

Communes of Ardèche
Ardèche communes articles needing translation from French Wikipedia